María Teresa Chacín (born January 22, 1945 in Caracas), is a Venezuelan singer.  She has recorded over 50 albums.  She has received honors including Latin Grammy Award for Best Latin Children's Album, Guaicaipuro de Oro, Meridiano de Oro, Cardenal de Oro, Gran Sol de Oriente, Idolo de Plata, Mara de Oro, Canaima de Oro, and the award Escenario Juvenil.

Discography
Quisiera Preguntar (1964)
Canta Para Tí (1965)
Todo Me Es Igual (1966)
María Teresa & Sus Exitos (1967)
Rosas En El Mar (1968)
Canta con María Teresa (1969)
La Paraulata (1970)
Cuando Me Quieras (1971)
Canciones Nuestras (1972)
Romance (1973)
Mi Querencia (1974)
Aguinaldos Que No Se Olvidan (1974)
Ahora (1976)
Canción De Cuna Para Una Estrella (1977)
Como Pequeña Gota De Rocío (1978)
Aguinaldos Venezolanos (1978)
En Azul, Amarillo y Rojo (1980)
Aguinaldos Tradicionales Vol. III (1980)
En Este País (1983)
Tú Eres La Música (1985)
Ojos Color De Los Pozos (1987)
M.T. Chacín y Sus Grandes Exitos (1990)
Yo soy venezolana (1992)
Romántica (1994)
Para Simón De María Teresa (1994)
Amor Mío (1995)
Con La Orquesta Sinfónica de Londres (1996)
Me Lo Dijeron Tus Ojos (1996)
Y Sus Amigos En Navidad (1997)
Y Sus Amigos en Vivo desde el TTC (1998)
Me Voy A Regalar (2001)
La Historia (1970–2002) (2003)
De Conde a Principal (2007)
María Teresa Chacín Cuenta Cuentos (2010)
Pasiones (2016)

External links
María Teresa Chacín Discography
The song Espléndida Noche by María Teresa Chacín

1945 births
Living people
Singers from Caracas
20th-century Venezuelan women singers
Venezuelan folk singers
Andrés Bello Catholic University alumni
Latin Grammy Award winners
Venezuela in the OTI Festival
Women in Latin music